The 2017 Miami Open presented by Itaú (also known as 2017 Miami Masters) was a professional men and women's tennis tournament played on outdoor hard courts. It was the 32nd edition of the Miami Open, and part of the Masters 1000 category on the 2017 ATP World Tour, and of the Premier Mandatory category on the 2017 WTA Tour. All men and women's events took place at the Tennis Center at Crandon Park in Key Biscayne, Florida, United States, from March 20 through April 2, 2017.

Points and prize money

Point distribution

 Players with byes receive first round points.

Prize money

ATP singles main-draw entrants

Seeds 
The following are the seeded players. Rankings and seedings are based on ATP rankings as of March 20, 2017.

Other entrants
The following players received wildcards into the singles main draw:
  Thomaz Bellucci 
  Michael Mmoh
  Andrey Rublev
  Casper Ruud
  Mikael Ymer

The following players received entry using a protected ranking:
  Tommy Haas
  Tommy Robredo

The following players received entry from the qualifying draw:
  Radu Albot
  Benjamin Becker
  Aljaž Bedene
  Jared Donaldson
  Ernesto Escobedo
  Christian Harrison
  Darian King
  Mikhail Kukushkin
  Lukáš Lacko
  Dušan Lajović
  Tim Smyczek
  Frances Tiafoe

The following player received entry as a lucky loser:
  Mikhail Youzhny

Withdrawals
Before the tournament
  Nicolás Almagro → replaced by  Nikoloz Basilashvili
  Marcos Baghdatis → replaced by  Dustin Brown
  Steve Darcis → replaced by  Guido Pella
  Novak Djokovic (elbow injury) → replaced by  Thiago Monteiro
  Richard Gasquet (appendicitis) → replaced by  Adam Pavlásek
  Daniil Medvedev → replaced by  Damir Džumhur
  Gaël Monfils (ankle injury) → replaced by  Konstantin Kravchuk
  Andy Murray (elbow injury) → replaced by  Taylor Fritz
  Bernard Tomic → replaced by  Mikhail Youzhny
  Jo-Wilfried Tsonga (birth of child) → replaced by  Yoshihito Nishioka

During the tournament
  Milos Raonic (hamstring injury)

Retirements
  Alexandr Dolgopolov
  Yoshihito Nishioka

ATP doubles main-draw entrants

Seeds

1 Rankings as of March 20, 2017.

Other entrants
The following pairs received wildcards into the doubles main draw:
  Nick Kyrgios /  Matt Reid
  Andrey Rublev /  Mikael Ymer

The following pair received entry as alternates:
  Marcus Daniell /  Marcelo Demoliner

Withdrawals
Before the tournament
  Lucas Pouille

During the tournament
  Pierre-Hugues Herbert

WTA singles main-draw entrants

Seeds
The following are the seeded players. Seedings are based on WTA rankings as of March 6, 2017. Rankings and points before are as of March 20, 2017.

Other entrants
The following players received wildcards into the singles main draw:
  Amanda Anisimova
  Paula Badosa Gibert
  Ashleigh Barty
  Nicole Gibbs
  Beatriz Haddad Maia
  Bethanie Mattek-Sands
  Ajla Tomljanović
  Natalia Vikhlyantseva

The following players received entry from the qualifying draw:
  Madison Brengle
  Verónica Cepede Royg
  Jana Čepelová
  Marina Erakovic
  Anett Kontaveit
  Varvara Lepchenko
  Kurumi Nara
  Risa Ozaki
  Aliaksandra Sasnovich
  Patricia Maria Țig
  Taylor Townsend
  Donna Vekić

The following player received entry as a lucky loser:
  Magda Linette

Withdrawals
Before the tournament
 Victoria Azarenka → replaced by  Mandy Minella
 Timea Bacsinszky → replaced by  Kateryna Bondarenko
 Catherine Bellis → replaced by  Magda Linette
 Camila Giorgi → replaced by  Belinda Bencic
 Petra Kvitová → replaced by  Carina Witthöft
 Sloane Stephens → replaced by  Jennifer Brady
 Serena Williams → replaced by  Wang Qiang

Retirements
 Danka Kovinić
 Garbiñe Muguruza
 Lesia Tsurenko

WTA doubles main-draw entrants

Seeds 

1 Rankings as of March 6, 2017.

Other entrants
The following pairs received wildcards into the doubles main draw:
  Jelena Janković /  Taylor Townsend
  Naomi Osaka /  Monica Puig
  Ajla Tomljanović /  Heather Watson

The following pair received entry as alternates:
  Lauren Davis /  Nicole Melichar

Withdrawals
Before the tournament
  Kiki Bertens (right knee injury)

Retirements
  Zhang Shuai (gastroenteritis)

Champions

Men's singles

  Roger Federer  def.  Rafael Nadal, 6–3, 6–4

Women's singles

  Johanna Konta  def.  Caroline Wozniacki, 6–4, 6–3

Men's doubles

 Łukasz Kubot /  Marcelo Melo def.  Nicholas Monroe /  Jack Sock, 7–5, 6–3

Women's doubles

  Gabriela Dabrowski /  Xu Yifan def.  Sania Mirza /  Barbora Strýcová, 6–4, 6–3

References

External links